St Loman's Mullingar GAA is a Gaelic Athletic Association club in Mullingar, Ireland.

History
The club was founded with the name Mental Hospital and represented the staff of St. Loman's Hospital, Mullingar, a psychiatric hospital which operated from 1855–2015. They played under the name Springfield Stars in 1910, becoming Mental Hospital in the 1920s and St. Loman's Mullingar in the late 1950s.

The club plays at St Loman's Sports Ground on the Delvin Road.

Gaelic football
St Loman's have won nine county senior titles

Hurling
Mental Hospital won the 1924 Westmeath Senior Hurling Championship.

Ladies' football
St Loman's Ground hosted the final of the 2000 All-Ireland Ladies Club Football Championship.

Notable players
Mick Carley
Jason Daly
Paddy Flanagan
John Heslin
Sam McCartan
Billy O'Loughlin
Ronan O'Toole
Paul Sharry
Phil Smyth

Honours
Westmeath Senior Football Championship winner: 1948, 1961, 1963, 2013, 2015, 2016, 2017, 2020, 2021
Westmeath Senior Hurling Championship winner: 1924

References

External links
Official site

Gaelic games clubs in County Westmeath
Gaelic football clubs in County Westmeath